Celia Au is a Hong Kong American actress and filmmaker based in Manhattan. She has appeared in the television series Lodge 49 (2018–2019) and Wu Assassins (2019).

Filmography

Film

Television series

See also
 Chinese people in New York City

References

External links

21st-century American actresses
Living people
American actresses of Chinese descent
Hong Kong emigrants to the United States
Hong Kong film actresses
Hong Kong television actresses
Hong Kong female taekwondo practitioners
American film actresses
American television actresses
American female taekwondo practitioners
Year of birth missing (living people)